The Virginia Division of Capitol Police is America's oldest police department, originating in 1618.

A legislative agency, today the Division of Capitol Police is responsible for:
General Law Enforcement for the Capitol Complex and properties assigned to the agency. They also share concurrent jurisdiction with the Richmond City Police Department.
Protective services for the Governor and Virginia's First Family while they are in-residence at the Executive Mansion.
Protective services and details for the Lieutenant Governor, Attorney General, the Justices of Virginia's Supreme Court, and members of the Virginia Legislature.
Special event assignments and security details throughout the Commonwealth

History
The capitol police was established in 1618 at Jamestown, Virginia. The Guard, consisting of 10 men was formed to protect the Governor from the hostile Indian population. By 1663, the force was expanded to a force of 20 men and assigned to protect the Governor, the council, and the Colonial Assembly. The Capitol was moved to Williamsburg, Virginia in 1699 where the Guard remained an important part of the executive and legislative process. In 1780, the Capitol of Virginia was again relocated to a safer location, its present home in Richmond. In 1801, the General Assembly enacted legislation creating The Public Guard, which was responsible for protecting public property in Richmond. This military force remained active until 1869.

The term "Capitol Police" was first used in an act of the Virginia General Assembly passed on January 28, 1884. This act provided "for the appointment of Capitol Police certain other employees about the Public Buildings and Grounds." The Capitol Police have steadily expanded in size and remain in service to this day.

Operations

Uniformed Operations 

Uniformed Patrol, Homeland Security, Special Operations and Investigations
Uniformed Patrol
K-9 
Emergency Medical Technicians
Investigations
Executive Protection
Security Clearances
 Honor Guard

Administrative Operations 

Emergency Preparedness Section and Administrative Section
Crime Prevention
Accreditation
Communications
Information Technology
Training
Quartermaster
Security Clearance Office

The Virginia State Police Executive Protective Unit is the primary security for the Governor.

See also

List of law enforcement agencies in Virginia

References

"The Great Charter of 1618"
"The Capitol Police" by Walter Griggs of Virginia Commonwealth University - Monograph 1981
"Acts of Assembly" by the Clerk of the Virginia House of Delegates

External links
Virginia Capitol Police
Virginia State Police EPU

1618 establishments in Virginia
Organizations based in Richmond, Virginia
State law enforcement agencies of Virginia
Specialist police departments of Virginia
Capitol police